The 1979 South African Open was a combined men's and women's tennis tournament played on outdoor hard courts in Johannesburg, South Africa. The men's tournament was part of the 1979 Colgate-Palmolive Grand Prix. It was the 76th edition of the tournament and was held from 27 November through 3 December 1979. Andrew Pattison and Brigitte Cuypers won the singles titles.

Finals

Men's singles
 Andrew Pattison defeated  Víctor Pecci 2–6, 6–3, 6–2, 6–3

Women's singles
 Brigitte Cuypers defeated  Tanya Harford 7–6, 6–2

Men's doubles
 Bob Hewitt /  Frew McMillan defeated  Heinz Günthardt /  Paul McNamee 1–6, 6–1, 6–4

Men's doubles
 Lesley Charles /  Tanya Harford defeated  Françoise Dürr /  Marise Kruger 1–6, 6–1, 6–4

References

External links
 ITF – Johannesburg tournament details

South African Open
South African Open (tennis)
Open
Sports competitions in Johannesburg
1970s in Johannesburg
November 1979 sports events in Africa
December 1979 sports events in Africa